Phantom energy is a hypothetical form of dark energy satisfying the equation of state with . It possesses negative kinetic energy, and predicts expansion of the universe in excess of that predicted by a cosmological constant, which leads to a Big Rip. The idea of phantom energy is often dismissed, as it would suggest that the vacuum is unstable with negative mass particles bursting into existence. The concept is hence tied to emerging theories of a continuously-created negative mass dark fluid, in which the cosmological constant can vary as a function of time.

Big Rip mechanism

The existence of phantom energy could cause the expansion of the universe to accelerate so quickly that a scenario known as the Big Rip, a possible end to the universe, occurs. The expansion of the universe reaches an infinite degree in finite time, causing expansion to accelerate without bounds.  This acceleration necessarily passes the speed of light (since it involves expansion of the universe itself, not particles moving within it), causing more and more objects to leave our observable universe faster than its expansion, as light and information emitted from distant stars and other cosmic sources cannot "catch up" with the expansion.  As the observable universe expands, objects will be unable to interact with each other via fundamental forces, and eventually, the expansion will prevent any action of forces between any particles, even within atoms, "ripping apart" the universe, making distances between individual particles infinite.

One application of phantom energy in 2007 was to a cyclic model of the universe, which reverses its expansion extremely shortly before the would-be Big Rip.

See also
 Quintessence (physics)

References

Further reading
 Robert R. Caldwell et al.: Phantom Energy and Cosmic Doomsday

Physical cosmology
Dark energy